Paris is the name of some places in the U.S. state of Wisconsin:
Paris, Grant County, Wisconsin, a town
Paris, Kenosha County, Wisconsin, a town
Paris (community), Wisconsin, an unincorporated community in Kenosha County